Eyk or EYK may refer to:

 Beloyarsk Airport, in Russia
 Eat Your Kimchi, a South Korean production company
 Tonny Eyk (born 1940), Dutch composer
 Eyik (lake), in Yakutia, Russia

See also
 Van Eyk